Alfragide is a parish in Amadora Municipality. The population in 2011 was 17,044, in an area of 2.51 km².

Its patron saint is Our Lady of Fatima.

In the extreme south of the parish is located the first IKEA store in Portugal as part of a major shopping areas of Lisbon. This shopping area also extends to the parishes of Buraca and, specially, Carnaxide (Oeiras).

References

Parishes of Amadora